Minoti Vaishnav (born November 19, 1987) is an Indian–born American screenwriter, songwriter, and entertainment producer. Born in Mumbai , she moved to Los Angeles at the age of 19, leaving her family back in India. At 22 she produced her first album "The Fictional Truth", with her first single "Psychologist" getting several thousands of downloads online. In 2012 she graduated from California State University Northridge and released her second album "Secret Garden" in 2013.

In spite of not being signed to a label, the music video for her single "So Will You" went semi-viral on YouTube with over 100,000 views and her songs have played on radio stations across the U.S, U.K, Canada, Singapore and Denmark. In 2015, she released her third album "Mix It Up".

On the film and television front, Minoti worked for the International Documentary Association and on HBO's Emmy nominated documentary American Winter (2013). She wrote and produced projects such as R.I.P (2011), 3 Orbs of Light (2011) and Being Independent (2015). Minoti has also developed and composed music for Alexis Krasilovsky's Award-winning documentary Let Them Eat Cake (2014), and has worked in production and development at various production companies. In 2020, she was hired as a staff writer on The Equalizer (2021 TV series) starring Queen Latifah.

Early life

Minoti grew up in Mumbai, India and attended Jamnabai Narsee School. She graduated from Jai Hind College, Mumbai before moving to the United States at age 19. She studied at Orange Coast College in Costa Mesa, CA, then transferred to California State University Northridge in 2010 and graduated with a Cinema & Television Arts degree and a minor in Creative Writing. She furthered her education by joining the prestigious MSt in Creative Writing program at the University of Oxford in 2018.

Music career

Minoti began writing songs at 11 years old and recorded her first professional demo at age 13. She learned how to play the guitar by ear, and at 16, she bought a keyboard and started taking professional vocal training as well as theory and ear training classes. With much help from her father, she started recording demos at home. Her first unofficial CD included the songs "Keep Track", "Promises" and "This is How I Feel" which were minor hits on Indie Artist website stereofame.com in 2008. 

In 2010, Minoti released her first album, "The Fictional Truth" and dropped her last name as an artist. The album is a raw indie-pop album with mostly live, acoustic songs. The album was released on August 1, 2010.  Minoti wrote and composed every single song on the album, with writing help from her cousins Farah Sheth and Vivek Vaishnav on the songs "Coffee" and "Tin Man". Seven out of eight of the songs were recorded in a home studio and were released with virtually no sound tweaking or editing. The only studio-produced track on the album, Psychologist, was an instant hit on Stereofame.com. The song is still played on radio stations throughout the world, most widely on EDA Music Radio.

Minoti crowdfunded her second album on Kickstarter. The album, "Secret Garden", is also raw indie-pop album, but includes a 90's alternative vibe. The album was released on March 4, 2013. Songs from the album – particularly "So Will You", "Nothing Inside" and "Secret Garden" have been played on radio stations all over the world – from the U.K to Singapore. The music video for the first single, "So Will You", received over 100,000 video views in its first few weeks of release. Indie critical reception was favorable. Music blog RippleMusic called "Secret Garden" "as catchy as the ebola virus" and stated that "Minoti's voice is understated and the music moves with a clever coolness". The album entered the Top 10 on Gashouse Radio in the #9 spot, and was featured on KALX Berkeley's "Next Big Thing".

On September 8, 2015, Minoti released "Mix It Up". The album features remixes of old favorites, two collaborations with Erik McCall as well as new original material.

Minoti and her music have been featured on podcasts and radio shows like Late Night With Laura, The EDA Music Podcast, Sweet Peas in a Podcast, The Vertikal Life Radio Show, Sunday Girl, and Next Big Thing.

Discography

Film and television career

Minoti's writing career officially started when she assisted with the script for the 28th Annual IDA Documentary Awards, held at the Directors Guild of America Theater in Los Angeles. Soon after, she landed her first producing and writing gig on the short film R.I.P (2012) for Lang Productions. She then worked in music licensing and composing on the award-winning documentary Let Them Eat Cake (2014), and wrote and produced the pilot for the show 3 Orbs of Light (2013) for PKM Images.

In 2013, Minoti started Prophecy Girl Films where she wrote and produced films like Stones (2014) and Abducted (2016). The company is described as "a hybrid between a marketing company and a production company". Company services include script development, marketing, social media, public relations and on-site production for film, television, books, and music. Under Prophecy Girl Films, Minoti produced, developed and provided PR services for several independent films including Doris (Endless Media, LLC), Women Behind the Camera (Rafael Film, LLC), My Guardian Angel (Vigilants Entertainment), Wordless (EDA Films) and many others.

Minoti then signed on to co-produce the digital documentary series Being Independent. Shot in Germany, the UK and the US, the series focuses on independent artists all over the world and the struggles they face as they try to make it. The series is co-produced by Erik McCall and Kitty Kalkbrenner. The series initially started out as a feature documentary, with limited funding. An IndieGoGo campaign to add funding to the project failed. In spite of this setback, a digital series was produced in 2015 and aired in Germany.

In 2017, Minoti ventured into the world of mainstream television, working as an associate producer and later as a development producer on docu-series like Hunting Hitler (History Channel), JFK Declassified: Tracking Oswald (History Channel), Legends of the Lost with Megan Fox (Travel Channel), Rise of Empires: Ottoman (Netflix) and many others. In 2020 and 2021, she was staffed as a writer on The Equalizer (2021 TV series) for Universal Television and CBS.

Minoti is an alumna of the MSt in Creative Writing program at the University of Oxford and has written articles for documentary.org, R6S, IndieScene Magazine, and Verve Magazine. Additionally, Minoti has worked in digital distribution, editing and PR on novels like Sex and the Cyborg Goddess by Alexis Krasilovsky, Sima's Healthy Indulgence by Sima Cohen and Oubliette: A Forgotten Little Place by Vanta M. Black. She is represented by Echo Lake Entertainment.

Other work

In June 2016, Minoti was elected President of the Alliance for Women in Media Southern California for the 2016-2017 term. She served on the Board of Directors for the Alliance for Women in Media Southern California as their Events Director for the 2015-2016 term. Through the Alliance for Women in Media Southern California as well as through Prophecy Girl Films, Minoti has programmed and produced high-profile events with 21st Century Fox and Paramount Pictures, and with additional sponsors including SAG-AFTRA and CBS. She has also run Q&A events and screenings with several Academy Award nominated documentary filmmakers, and continues to host, program and produce entertainment panels and events in partnership with various media organizations.

Minoti is a member of the Writers Guild of America West, The Recording Academy, The Academy of Television Arts & Sciences, Broadcast Music Inc. and the Phi Beta Delta International Honor Society. She is on the Advisory Board for the Alliance for Women in Media Southern California, and an Executive Board Member of Chicks With Scripts.

References

External links 

1987 births
Living people
People from Mumbai
People from Los Angeles
Indian emigrants to the United States
Jai Hind College alumni
California State University, Northridge alumni
Alumni of the University of Oxford
American women songwriters
American women screenwriters
American expatriates in India
21st-century American women